Uqhu (Quechua for swamp, Hispanicized spelling Uco) or Ukhu (Quechua for deep) is a mountain in the Andes of Peru, about  high. It is located in the Junín Region, Yauli Province, Marcapomacocha District. Uqhu lies northwest of Yuraqqucha and Pukaqucha. It is situated northeast of a plain called Pampa Uqhu ("swamp plain", Hispanicized Pampa Uco). Uqhu is also the name of the little lake west of the mountain.

References

Mountains of Peru
Mountains of Junín Region